Gowdpadeh (also Romanized as Godark, Govak, and Gowdark) is a village in Howmeh Rural District, in the Central District of Bam County, Kerman Province, Iran. At the 2006 census, its population was 49, in 20 families.

References 

Populated places in Bam County